Shivani Desai (born 13 February 1986), professionally known as Rashami Desai, is an Indian television actress. Desai is the recipient of several accolades including two Indian Television Academy Awards and Gold Awards. She has established herself as one of the most popular and highest-paid actresses on television.

After starting her acting career in Indian films, Desai made her Hindi television debut with Ravan (2006) and then had a dual role in Pari Hoon Main (2008). She earned massive popularity with her notable work as Tapasya Thakur in Colors TV's long-running soap opera Uttaran (2009-2014), winning various accolades. Desai also took part in the reality shows  Zara Nachke Dikha 2 (2010), Jhalak Dikhhla Jaa 5 (2012), Fear Factor: Khatron Ke Khiladi 6 (2015) and Nach Baliye 7 (2015) and had a cameo in the 2012 film Dabangg 2. She ventured into stand-up comedy with reality shows like Comedy Circus Mahasangram (2010), Comedy Ka Maha Muqabala (2011), Kahaani Comedy Circus Ki (2012) and Comedy Nights Live (2016).

Desai later returned to fiction television with the love triangle Dil Se Dil Tak (2017-2018) portraying the role of Shorvori, after which she participated in Bigg Boss 13 (2019–2020) and Bigg Boss 15 (2021–2022). In this period, she also played brief roles in Naagin 4 and Naagin 6, and made her OTT debut with the short film Tamas and web debut with Tandoor.

Early life 
Rashami Desai was born Shivani Desai on 13 February 1986 in Nagaon town of Assam. She is a Gujarati by origin. She has a brother, Gaurav Desai. Desai was born and brought in Mumbai and did her schooling and undergraduation there Rashami pursued a diploma degree in Tours and Travels from Narsee Monjee College of Commerce and Economics, Mumbai.

Career

Acting debut in films (2002–2006) 
Desai began her acting career with regional films where she appeared in an Assamese-language film titled Kanyadaan in 2002. Desai made her Bollywood debut with Birendra Nath Tiwari-directed 2004 romantic mystery Yeh Lamhe Judaai Ke alongside Shah Rukh Khan and Raveena Tandon. She essayed the role of Sheetal, a college student whose elder sister (played by Tandon) is murdered.

In 2005, Desai appeared in the Hindi film Shabnam Mausi, where she played the role of Naina alongside Ashutosh Rana and Vijay Raaz. She later earned fame in the Bhojpuri film industry where she played many roles in the films like Balma Bada Nadaan and Gabbar Singh. In 2005, Desai starred in the film Kab Hoi Gauna Hammar, that went on to win the National Award for Best Feature Film in Bhojpuri.

Television debut and breakthrough (2006–2008) 
Desai made her television debut in 2006 with the mythological drama series Ravan on Zee TV, where she played the role of Queen Mandodari. Desai was cast opposite Jay Soni in the series. In 2007, Desai appeared in the English film titled Sambar Salsa.

In 2008, Desai got her first big break in daily soaps that fetched her the limelight with her portrayal of the dual role of Nikki Shrivastav and Pari Rai Choudhary in Star One's Pari Hoon Main. Directed and produced by Ravi Chopra, the series also featured Mohit Malik and Karan Veer Mehra in pivotal roles. The show followed the story of two look-alikes; Pari (an actress) and Nikki (a simple girl) who bump into each other,  exchange their identities, and begin living each other's lives. Desai then appeared as Priya in Star One's horror thriller anthology series Ssshhhh...Phir Koi Hai alongside Manish Paul.

Established success with Uttaran (2009–2016) 

In 2009, Desai briefly appeared in Meet Mila De Rabba aired on Sony TV where she played the role of Dr. Meher Datta alongside Surilie Gautam and Piyush Sahdev.

Desai earned widespread acclaim and recognition upon entering Colors TV's long-running soap opera Uttaran in 2009, where she played the parallel lead alongside Tina Datta and Nandish Sandhu. The series followed the story of two friends, Ichcha and Tapasya, who hail from different strata of the society. Desai replaced Ishita Panchal to play the role of adult Tapasya Thakur, a rich girl who gets manipulated by her maternal grandmother upon feeling less loved than her friend by her own parents. Uttaran opened up newer international markets for Indian Television, making Desai a household name beyond the country's shores. For Uttaran, Desai received numerous accolades and nominations including the ITA Award for Best Actress Popular and Indian Telly Award for Best Actress in a Negative Role Popular in 2010. In January 2012 she opted out of the show. On 7 November 2012, she returned to Uttaran with positive shades, and left the show again in 2014 citing creative differences.

In 2010, Desai participated in Sony TV's comedy reality TV show Comedy Circus 3 Ka Tadka as a wildcard entrant with Vikrant Massey. Desai then participated as a member of the team "Massakalli Girls" in season 2 of the dance Reality tv show Zara Nachke Dikha which aired on Star Plus. Her team emerged as winners. In the same year, Desai also appeared as panelist in Imagine TV's reality show Meethi Choori No 1 and participated in Sony TV's comedy reality show Comedy Circus Mahasangram.

In 2011, Desai participated in Star Plus's comedy reality TV show Comedy Ka Maha Muqabala, where her team emerged as runner-ups.

In 2012, Desai appeared as Shivani in the Vikram Bhatt-directed horror anthology series Haunted Nights, aired on Sahara One. She then participated in the dance reality TV show Jhalak Dikhhla Jaa 5 which aired on Colors TV  and ultimately emerged as the first runner up. She also appeared on the Shekhar Suman hosted show Movers and Shakers. Later in 2012, Desai made a cameo appearance in the Salman Khan starrer Hindi film Dabangg 2.

In 2013, Desai played the part of Natkhat Sali in Colors TV's stand-up comedy show Nautanki: The Comedy Theatre.

In 2014, Desai appeared as a victim of blind faith and a woman who is tortured by her own family in the episode-based shows Savdhaan India and CID respectively.

In 2015, Desai participated in Fear Factor: Khatron Ke Khiladi 6. She was eliminated, but was brought back on the show as a wild card entrant. She was again eliminated just before the finale along with Sana Khan. She then participated in Nach Baliye 7 with her then spouse Nandish Sandhu and they became first runners-up. In October 2015, Desai appeared as a deaf and mute girl in Palash Muchhal's music video titled Teri Ek Hassi alongside Nandish Sandhu. It was sung by Jubin Nautiyal. Later in the year, Desai briefly appeared in Colors TV's Ishq Ka Rang Safed where she played the grey role of Tulsi, a widow with hidden motives.

In 2016, Desai essayed the negative role of dark supernatural character Preeti in &TV's Adhuri Kahaani Hamari. She also participated in Box Cricket League in March 2016. Desai then appeared in Palash Muchhal's dance based music video titled Sajna Ve alongside Salman Yusuff Khan. It was sung by Monali Thakur and Dilip Soni. Desai then participated in Balaji Telefilms' comedy reality show Mazaak Mazaak Mein, aired on Life OK. Desai also completed the 2016 anthology drama film Rare & Dare Six-X, that also starred Rituparna Sengupta and Shweta Tiwari in important roles.

Dil Se Dil Tak and beyond (2017–2020) 

In 2017, Desai starred in Colors TV's drama series Dil Se Dil Tak, opposite Sidharth Shukla and Jasmin Bhasin. Desai was cast in the role of  Shorvari Bhanushali, a woman caught between love for her husband and her desire to be a mother. The series was loosely based on the Hindi film Chori Chori Chupke Chupke (2001). Desai described her role as someone who "doesn’t express through words. She uses gestures, eyes and her facial expressions to express what she is feeling. That is interesting. In fact, as an actor, this gives me a lot of scope for performance.". For her role in the series, she was nominated under Best Actress category at Golden Petal Awards 2017.

In the same year, Desai made her Gujarati film debut with Bhavin Wadia's romantic thriller Superstar, where she was cast opposite Dhruvin Shah.

Desai began 2019 with the lead role in DD National's comedy series Chalo Saaf Karein. Launched by Doordarshan along with the Ministry of Drinking Water and Sanitation, the show revolved around cleanliness and sanitation with a comic twist. Desai played the role of Palak, an ambitious Delhi University graduate and a strong follower of Gandhian ideology and Swachhta, who intends to open a residential English medium school in her village. The series also featured Ashish Lal, Aruna Irani and Anita Raj in pivotal roles. Later in the year, Desai participated in the reality show Bigg Boss 13, where she finished as third runner up.

In 2020, Desai essayed the role of Shalaka on Colors TV's supernatural fantasy thriller television series Naagin 4: Bhagya Ka Zehreela Khel alongside Nia Sharma, Anita Hassanandani and Vijayendra Kumeria. Desai next appeared in the short film Tamas alongside Adhvik Mahajan, where she played the role of Sania and participated in Ladies vs Gentlemen, a reality interactive game show hosted by Ritesh Deshmukh and Genelia D'souza in the same year. In December 2020, Desai featured in Palash Muchhal's dance based music video titled Ab Kya Jaan Legi Meri alongside Shaheer Sheikh and Sana Saeed. It was sung by Palash Muchhal and Amit Mishra.

Professional expansion (2021–present) 
In 2021, Desai made her web debut alongside Tanuj Virwani in Nivedita Basu-directed crime drama web series titled Tandoor. Loosely based on the infamous Tandoor case in Delhi, Desai essayed the role of Palak Sahni, an aspiring politician who is murdered by her own husband (played by Virwani). In May 2021, it was announced that Desai will collaborate with singer Rahul Vaidya for a music cover. In September 2021, Desai appeared in Altamash Faridi's music video titled Subhan Allah. Later in the year, Desai collaborated with Rahul Vaidya again for a music video titled Zindagi Khafa Khafa. In November 2021, Desai entered Bigg Boss 15 as a wilcard contestant and became the fifth runner-up.

In March 2022, Desai featured in three music videos titled Qatilana, Biraj Mein Jhoom and Tere Pind. She then entered Naagin 6 for a cameo to portray the dual role shape-shifting serpents, reprising the role of Shalaka from season 4 with positive shades, and a new character Shanglira.  In April 2022, Desai collaborated with Neha Bhasin for a music video titled Parwah.

Desai is scheduled to appear in the second season of Anil V Kumar's hit anthology series Ratri Ke Yatri, that intends to throw an empathetic light on women from red light areas. Her segment also features Mohit Abrol and Abigail Pande in crucial roles.The show will be premiered on Hungama Play and MX Player.

Off-screen work and media image 
Desai is a trained classical dancer.
Writing for The Indian Express,  journalist Sana Farzeen stated: "Not someone to play the perfect heroine, Rashami has experimented with her roles and played strong characters." Apart from acting, Desai supports various causes.
Desai walked the ramp at Caring with Style fashion show to raise money for cancer patients in 2015 and 2018 for designers Shaina NC and Abu Jani-Sandeep Khosla respectively. In 2015, she walked the ramp of a fashion show to support Smile Foundation, a non-governmental organisation working towards underprivileged children's education and health. Desai also walked the ramp for Terry Fox Foundation and Maheka Mirpuri. Desai was part of the Swachh Survekshan 2017, an initiative for an environmentally cleaner India (Swachh Bharat Abhiyan).

Desai walked the ramp for designers Rohit Verma and Anu Mehra at Bombay Times Fashion Week in 2020 and 2021.

In 2013, 2014 and 2018, she was among the highest-paid television actresses of India. As per reports, Desai was also the highest paid contestant in Bigg Boss 13 and Bigg Boss 15. In 2020, Desai became the first Indian Television actor to collaborate with Google for cameos. Desai was ranked 22nd in BizAsia's list of top 30 TV Personalities in 2020.

Desai endorsed Wheel alongside Salman Khan in 2010. In 2021, Desai became the brand ambassador of JioMart. Desai also endorses Hangyo.

Personal life 

She married her co-star from Uttaran, Nandish Sandhu, on 12 February 2011 in Ghaziabad. In 2014, they separated, and in 2015, the couple filed for divorce after almost four years of marriage.

In 2018, Desai met Arhaan Khan, they both participated in Bigg Boss 13 in 2019, where Arhaan proposed to Desai, and Desai accepted the proposal. Later, it was revealed by Salman Khan that Arhaan was married before and had a kid which he had kept secret from Desai. In 2020, after coming out from the Bigg Boss house, Desai broke up with Arhaan.

Filmography

Films

Web series

Television

Special appearances

Music videos

Awards and nominations

References

External links 

 
 

1986 births
Living people
Gujarati people
Indian film actresses
Indian soap opera actresses
Actresses in Hindi television
Actresses in Assamese cinema
Actresses in Bhojpuri cinema
Actresses in Gujarati cinema
Indian female dancers
Actresses from Mumbai

21st-century Indian actresses
Fear Factor: Khatron Ke Khiladi participants
Bigg Boss (Hindi TV series) contestants
Big Brother (franchise) contestants